Flag is an extinct community in Taney County, in the U.S. state of Missouri.  It was on the west side of the county, near the Stone County line, a bit north of the present day location of the Table Rock Dam.

A post office called Flag was established in 1900, and remained in operation until 1927. Flag once contained a schoolhouse, which is now defunct. Some say the community was named after the American flag, while others believe it was named for a flag station near the original town site.

References

Ghost towns in Missouri
Former populated places in Taney County, Missouri